The 2013 Kentucky 300 was the 27th stock car race of the 2013 NASCAR Nationwide Series and the second iteration of the event. The race was held on Saturday, September 21, 2013, in Sparta, Kentucky, at Kentucky Speedway, a 1.5-mile (2.41 km) tri-oval speedway. The race took the scheduled 200 laps to complete. At race's end, Ryan Blaney, driving for Penske Racing, would be able to hold off the field on the final restart to win his first career NASCAR Nationwide Series win and his only win of the season. To fill out the podium, Austin Dillon and Matt Crafton, both driving for Richard Childress Racing, would finish second and third, respectively.

Background 

Kentucky Speedway is a 1.5-mile (2.4 km) tri-oval speedway in Sparta, Kentucky, which has hosted ARCA, NASCAR and Indy Racing League racing annually since it opened in 2000. The track is currently owned and operated by Speedway Motorsports, Inc. and Jerry Carroll, who, along with four other investors, owned Kentucky Speedway until 2008. The speedway has a grandstand capacity of 117,000. Construction of the speedway began in 1998 and was completed in mid-2000. The speedway has hosted the Gander RV & Outdoors Truck Series, Xfinity Series, IndyCar Series, Indy Lights, and most recently, the NASCAR Cup Series beginning in 2011.

Entry list 

 (R) denotes rookie driver.
 (i) denotes driver who is ineligible for series driver points.

Practice 
Originally, two practice sessions were scheduled to be held on Friday, September 20, but the final session would get canceled due to rain.

The only one-hour and 30-minute practice session was held on Friday, September 20, at 3:30 PM EST.

Qualifying 
Qualifying was held on Saturday, September 21, at 4:35 PM EST. Each driver would have two laps to set a fastest time; the fastest of the two would count as their official qualifying lap.

Danny Efland would be the only driver to fail to qualify.

Full qualifying results

Race results

Standings after the race 

Drivers' Championship standings

Note: Only the first 10 positions are included for the driver standings.

References 

2013 NASCAR Nationwide Series
NASCAR races at Kentucky Speedway
September 2013 sports events in the United States
2013 in sports in Kentucky